Mate Selak (born 9 April 1987 in Croatia) is a Croatian retired footballer.

Career

At the age of 15, Selak left Croatia and trained with A.S. Roma in Italy, Barcelona in Spain, Karlsruher SC and Hertha BSC in Germany and Girondins de Bordeaux in France.

On the 17th of April 2006, he made his first start for HNK Hajduk Split in the Croatian Eternal derby against GNK Dinamo Zagreb, which the former won 1–0. However, after head coach Luka Bonačić was beaten with a baseball bat, Selak was suspected of perpetrating the crime, which affected his career. After being released from HNK Hajduk Split, he played in the Croatian third division, in Slovenia, and the Swiss lower leagues. By 2014, he was in the Croatian fourth division.

References

External links
 
 

1987 births
Living people
Association football midfielders
Croatian footballers
HNK Hajduk Split players
HNK Šibenik players
NK Solin players
NK Imotski players
RNK Split players
NK Konavljanin players
NK Uskok players
NK Domžale players
NK Radomlje players
NK Hrvace players
Croatian Football League players
First Football League (Croatia) players
Second Football League (Croatia) players
Slovenian PrvaLiga players
Slovenian Second League players
Croatian expatriate footballers
Expatriate footballers in Slovenia
Croatian expatriate sportspeople in Slovenia
Expatriate footballers in Switzerland
Croatian expatriate sportspeople in Switzerland